Maulana Azad College of Engineering and Technology (MACET) is an engineering institute in the city of Patna,  Bihar, India. The college is affiliated to Aryabhatta Knowledge University and approved by All India Council for Technical Education. It is also recognized by the Department of Science and Technology, Government of Bihar.

Foundation
The college was founded by the Milat Education Society, Patna in 1988. It is the oldest private engineering college in Bihar.

Governance 
The college is governed by the governing body of the College, whose president is Dr. Ahmad Abdul Hai, a surgeon of Patna, secretary  Md. Ehsan Ahmad (Retd. IAS), and eight other members.

Administration 
The administration of the college is run by a team consisting of 14 members, whose head is the Director of MACET.

Academics 
MACET offers five engineering courses in the following discipline :

Computer Science and Engineering
Mechanical Engineering
Civil Engineering
Electrical Engineering
Electronics Engineering

See also
Education in Bihar
Education in Patna

References

External links 
 

Engineering colleges in Bihar
Universities and colleges in Patna
Memorials to Abul Kalam Azad
Educational institutions established in 1988
1988 establishments in Bihar
Colleges affiliated to Aryabhatta Knowledge University